Mohammed el Fakih  (born 7 February 1990) is a Moroccan footballer who plays for Saudi club Al-Arabi. as an attacking midfielder.

Career
He started his youth career with Raja Casablanca, but did not get his full chance with his childhood team, so he left for JS Massira to seek more games. A year later  he proved himself in the Second Division with Chabab El Masira so he got signed by Kawkab Marrakech for the 2015 season.
Kawkab Marrakech had a chance to participate in the 2016 CAF Confederation Cup, and he was one of the best players of the tournament scoring 6 goals and taking his team to the group stage with strong teams such as Etoile Sahel .
2016 has been a good year for Mohammed el Fakih. Therefore, Raja Casablanca has offered him a contract but he signed a 2 years extension that will make him stay until 2018.

In January 2019, El Fakih was loaned out to Youssoufia Berrechid from FAR Rabat.

On 25 December 2022, El Fakih joined Saudi Arabian club Al-Arabi.

References

External links

Moroccan footballers
1990 births
Living people
Association football midfielders
Raja CA players
JS Massira players
AS FAR (football) players
Kawkab Marrakech players
Olympique Club de Khouribga players
Maghreb de Fès players
Al-Ahli SC (Tripoli) players
Al-Arabi SC (Saudi Arabia) players
Botola players
Libyan Premier League players
Saudi First Division League players
Expatriate footballers in Libya
Expatriate footballers in Saudi Arabia
Moroccan expatriate sportspeople in Libya
Moroccan expatriate sportspeople in Saudi Arabia